The Kitten from Lizyukov Street 2 is a 2017 Russian computer animated short film produced by Wizart Animation and directed by Alexey Zamyslov.

The adaptation is the sequel to Kitten from Lizyukov Street that also features the previous film's themes of nostalgia to the native homeland. The dialogues and script is written by the author of the first part of the cartoon Vyacheslav Kotyonochkin. The short film was made with feature-film quality standards and is a continuation of the Soviet Union classic film into the Russian era.

Plot 
The kitten Vaska and the puppy Bulka, thanks to the magic Crow move from snow-covered Voronezh to sunny Australia. There Vaska gets acquainted with kangaroos, koalas, wombats, ostriches and escapes with all his might from sharks and crocodiles. And then he invites new friends to his native Voronezh. The main characters will plunge into a whirlwind of incredible adventures and dangers, but also find new friends, and most importantly, they will understand that there is no better place like home on whole of Earth.

Voice cast 

 Dmitriy Kurta as Vas'ka
 Olga Shorokhova as Bul'ka
 Irina Ponomaryova as Crow
 Lina Ivanova as Kangaroo
 Alexander Noskov as Crocodile
 Yekaterina Semyonova as Mama Kangaroo

Production 
In 2017 there were plans for the continuation of the Soviet Union animation classic Kitten from Lizyukov Street. Wizart Animation was proposed as the animation studio for production. Governor Alexey Gordeev in 2017 at a meeting assured Wizart Animation, the Voronezh animation studio all support of the Voronezh Region in carrying out the task of adapting the Soviet Union sequel. The short film was intended to find a positive response among the widest audience.

First the necessary legality framework had to be considered before the proposal was passed. Soyuzmultfilm the animation studio that bought the original film to the screens agreed for joint production with Wizart Animation. Nikolay Makovsky, producer of the Soyuzmultfilm film studio stated, "We are sure that we will get a good animated film aimed for children. It has a piece of Soyuzmultfilm in it."

The original right holders to the film; Alexey Kotenochkin and Lyudmila Zlotnikova also agreed to start the production. Originally an unpublished sequel story by acclaimed Russian writer Vitaly Markovich Zlotnikov who wrote for the first film never went into production. There was no time for the production and the idea was put in the shelves. The writers of the 2017 sequel originally were unaware of the posthumous work. However they were enthusiastic in adapting the unpublished sequel script given to them by Zlotnikova. Lyudmila Zlotnikova noted "according to his works, 14 cartoons were staged: 13 during his lifetime, the 14th-already without him. And now it will be the 15th cartoon based on the works of Vitaly Markovich." Lyudmila Zlotnikova also took part in the creation of the film. The script also contained the dialogues of the characters.

Alexey Kotenochkin, the son of Vyacheslav Kotyonochkin who worked with the director of the original film as production designer also approved of the idea: "The main thing is that there are all the components of a good film – high-quality animation, high-quality music and an interesting story. And it is especially nice that the sequel will be filmed in Voronezh."

The film was intended as a twelve-minute 3D animated short film scheduled for release in 2017. Production started as early as 2014 with copyright negotiation taking over two years. The film would be a sequel and not a remake. During the time period director Timur Bekmambetov visited Voronezh and proposed the idea of being part of the production team for the sequel short film. The project became Wizart Animation's first short film. The film will have the acclaimed song by Vladimir Migulya intact while in terms of animation the studio tried to preserve the style of the first film as much as possible.

According to producer Yuri Moskvin, the project tried to animate the Soviet Union kitten Vasily and his story into a Russian era story - "The cartoon is undoubtedly an important project for us, which we treated with the utmost trepidation. The classic Soviet animation in a new interpretation has acquired the 3D format, the kitten has become more modern, in the spirit of the times." Voronezh animators thought of at first going to traditional animation. However they were used to draw everything in detail changing the animation format. Furthermore, the studio staff worked overtime for the film conceptualizing the project as if it was a full-length film. The studio acknowledged the production is their tribute to their hometown.

The sequel script focused on themes of nostalgia for the native country as well as the attractions component of the film conceptualized by the character Kitten Vaska who starts a travel agency. The main setting will be Australia. The film was presented at the 2017 MIPCOM.

The pre-premiere of the short film coincided on 31 August 2017, before Day of Knowledge at Voronezh. The governor of Voronezh was at the pre-premiere who explained, "Vasily is the same kitten who lived in the twentieth century in a country called the Soviet Union. Now he lives in the twenty-first century in a country called Russia." The animation project is intended to raise the level of tourism in Voronezh, as the film depicts recognizable places of the city such as Admiralty Square, Goto Predestination and the monument to the White Bim Black Ear.

The short film was part of the CARTOON in the cinema program on 26 May 2018 as well as the July 2018 Multimir festival of animation and entertainment. For the first time in September 2019, an art object from Wizart Animation decorated Voronezh as the Square Nikitinskiy Park featured graffiti paintings of the characters from The Kitten from Lizyukov Street 2.

Accolades

References

External links 

2017 animated films
2017 short films
Russian animated short films
Films set in Australia
Soyuzmultfilm
Animated films about cats
Animated films about animals
2010s animated short films
Teleportation in films